is a passenger railway station located in  Higashi-ku, Sakai, Osaka Prefecture, Japan, operated by the private railway operator Nankai Electric Railway. It has the station number "NK61".

Lines

Layout
The station consists of two island platforms connected by an underground passage.

Platforms

Adjacent stations

History
It was renamed to its present name on August 1, 1935.

Passenger statistics
In fiscal 2019, the station was used by an average of 8256 passengers daily.

Surrounding area
 Osaka Prefectural Kanaoka High School
 Sakai City Hiokiso Junior High School
 Sakai City Hikisho Elementary School

See also
 List of railway stations in Japan

References

External links

 Hatsushiba Station from Nankai Electric Railway website   

Railway stations in Japan opened in 1898
Railway stations in Osaka Prefecture
Sakai, Osaka